Season seventeen of the television program American Experience originally aired on the PBS network in the United States on October 4, 2004 and concluded on May 23, 2005.  The season contained 11 new episodes and began with the film RFK.

Episodes

References

2004 American television seasons
2005 American television seasons
American Experience